The Pakistan national badminton team represents Pakistan in international badminton team competitions. It is controlled by the Pakistan Badminton Federation, the governing body for badminton in Pakistan. The national team was established in 1953.

Pakistan had only appeared in the international stage three times as they were eliminated in the group stage in the 1993, 1995 and 1997 edition of the Sudirman Cup.

The nation would make its first badminton debut in the Olympics when national player Mahoor Shahzad represented the country in the women's singles discipline.

The team would later participate in the 2022 Commonwealth Games mixed team event through a bipartite invitation.

Participation in BWF competitions

Sudirman Cup

Participation in WBF World Championships 
In 1979, Pakistan participated in the World Championships organised by the WBF, which was a rival body of the Badminton World Federation that would later ceased its operation on May 26, 1981, and merged with the International Badminton Federation (now known as Badminton World Federation or BWF). They won a bronze and a silver at the event, in men's team and men's singles.

Men's team

Participation in Asian Games 
Although badminton is not a very popular sport in Pakistan, its team once entered the semifinals in the 1978 Asian Games in the men's team event, where veterans Javed Iqbal, Zahid Maqbool, Hassan Shaheed and Tariq Wadood took home the bronze.

Men's team

Women's team

Participation in Badminton Asia Team Championships
Mixed team

Participation in South Asian Games 
The national team have only achieved one runner-up, which was in 2004. The team also achieved a lot of semifinals positions, particularly in 2006, 2016 and 2019.

Men's team

Women's team

Current squad 

Male players
Murad Ali
Muhammad Atique
Raja Muhammad Hasnain
Muhammad Muqeet Tahir
Awais Zahid
Muhammad Irfan Saeed Bhatti

Female players
Sehra Akram
Palwasha Bashir
Huma Javeed
Bushra Qayyum
Ghazala Saddique
Mahoor Shahzad

References

Badminton
National badminton teams
Badminton in Pakistan